Ugie or UGIE may refer to:
 Ugie, Eastern Cape, a town in South Africa
 River Ugie, a river in Scotland
 Ugie Hospital, a hospital in Scotland
 Upper gastrointestinal endoscopy, a medical procedure
 Utkalmani Gopabandhu Institute of Engineering, a college in India
 Ugie Urbina, Venezuelan basketball player

See also 
 Uggie, a dog
 Ugi (disambiguation)